The John Waddey Carter House is a historic home located at Martinsville, Virginia. It was reportedly based on a design by architect George Franklin Barber and built in 1896.  It is a two-story, irregularly massed, gray frame weatherboard sheathed Queen Anne style dwelling.  It features a dominant two-story central gable, an asymmetrical one-story wrap-around porch, and a polygonal corner tower. It is topped by a standing-seam metal-clad hipped roof with steeply pitched lower cross gables. It also has a two-story bay window and service ell.

It was listed on the National Register of Historic Places in 1988.  It is located in the East Church Street-Starling Avenue Historic District.

References

Houses on the National Register of Historic Places in Virginia
Houses completed in 1896
Queen Anne architecture in Virginia
Houses in Martinsville, Virginia
National Register of Historic Places in Martinsville, Virginia
Individually listed contributing properties to historic districts on the National Register in Virginia